= Synomelix =

Scientific classification
- Domain: Eukaryota
- Kingdom: Animalia
- Phylum: Arthropoda
- Class: Insecta
- Order: Hymenoptera
- Family: Ichneumonidae
- Genus: Synomelix; Förster, 1869

Genus of insects

Synomelix is a genus of parasitoid wasps belonging to the family Ichneumonidae.

The species of this genus are found in Europe and Northern America.

Species:

- Synomelix albipes (Gravenhorst, 1829)
- Synomelix faciator Idar, 1983
